Nolan is an unincorporated community in southeastern Nolan County, Texas, United States.  It lies along FM 126 southeast of the city of Sweetwater, the county seat of Nolan County.  Its elevation is 2,493 feet (760 m),  which happens to be the average elevation of the United States. Although Nolan is unincorporated, it has a post office, with the ZIP code of 79537; the ZCTA for ZIP Code 79537 had a population of 94 at the 2000 census.

Nolan was founded in 1928 as a union of two communities: a previous Nolan (to the west), and Dora (to the east).

External links
Profile of Nolan from the Handbook of Texas Online
Divide School operated in Nolan between 1928 and 1985.

References

Unincorporated communities in Nolan County, Texas
Unincorporated communities in Texas
Populated places established in 1928